The 2022 Colonial Athletic Association women's basketball tournament is a postseason women's basketball tournament for the Colonial Athletic Association for the 2021–22 NCAA Division I women's basketball season. The tournament will be held from March 10–13, 2022 at the Daskalakis Athletic Center in Philadelphia, Pennsylvania.

Seeds

Schedule

Bracket

* denotes overtime game

See also
 2022 CAA men's basketball tournament

References

External links
 2022 CAA Women's Basketball Championship

Colonial Athletic Association women's basketball tournament
Tournament
CAA
Basketball competitions in Philadelphia
College basketball tournaments in Pennsylvania
Women's sports in Pennsylvania
CAA women's basketball tournament